The Brand New/Modest Mouse Tour was a United States concert tour by American alternative rock bands Brand New and Modest Mouse. The tour lasted from June 2016 to July 2016.

Setlist
The following setlist was obtained from the July 19, 2016 concert, held at the Ascend Amphitheater in Nashville. It does not represent all concerts for the duration of the tour.

Modest Mouse
The Ground Walks, With Time in a Box
Black Cadillacs
Never Ending Math Equation
Invisible
Dashboard
Dark Center of the Universe
Trailer Trash
Dramamine
Bukowski
This Devil's Workday
Shit in Your Cut
Tiny Cities Made of Ashes
Lampshades on Fire
Blame It on the Tetons
Fly Trapped in a Jar

Brand New
Sink
Gasoline
Millstone
Noro
Tautou
Sic Transit Gloria... Glory Fades
I Will Play My Game Beneath the Spin Light
Okay I Believe You, but My Tommy Gun Don't
The Quiet Things That No One Ever Knows
Degausser
I Am a Nightmare
Brothers
Limousine (MS Rebridge)
Jesus
Luca
Sowing Season
Encore:
Moshi Moshi
Play Crack the Sky (Jesse and Vin)
You Won't Know (Tautou breakdown)

Tour dates

References

2016 concert tours